The Picture of Dorian Gray is an American film directed and written by Dave Rosenbaum, starring Josh Duhamel.

Plot summary

Cast 
 Josh Duhamel as Dorian Gray
 Branden Waugh as Harry Wotton
 Rainer Judd as Basil Ward
 Darby Stanchfield as Sibyl Vane
 Brian Durkin as James Vane
 Julie Amos as Laura Wotton

References

External links 
 
 
 

2004 films
American horror films
Films based on The Picture of Dorian Gray
2004 horror films
2000s English-language films
2000s American films